The Hyundai Venue is a subcompact crossover SUV manufactured by the South Korean manufacturer Hyundai. The Venue debuted at the 2019 New York International Auto Show as Hyundai's smallest global crossover prior to the introduction of the Casper. , the Venue is positioned between the Kona or Creta, and above the Casper in Hyundai's international lineup. It shares its platform with the Hyundai Accent.

Overview 
Two versions of the Venue were developed and produced for different markets. The Korean-made Venue is code named QX or QX1, while the Indian-oriented, internally code named as QXi, is shorter in length and wheelbase than the Korean version.

The Venue is not marketed in Europe in favour of the European-focused, Hyundai i20-based Bayon which was introduced in 2021.

Markets

India (QXi) 
The Venue was launched on May 21, 2019, in India and was initially available in 5 trim levels: E, S, SX, SX+, and SX(O). As of December 2019, bookings had crossed the 100,000 mark.

In the Indian market, the Venue occupies the sub-4 metre SUV category, benefiting from the Indian tax advantages for cars shorter than 4 metres. The turbo petrol exclusively gets an option of a 7-speed dual-clutch automatic transmission and a 6-speed manual as well.

The 1.4-litre diesel engine which the Venue was originally launched with, was replaced by a 1.5-litre Bharat Stage 6-compliant diesel engine in March 2020. The 1.5-litre diesel engine is paired with a 6-speed manual transmission.

In July 2020, a 6-speed clutchless manual transmission option was introduced for the 1.0-litre engine. It is marketed as iMT technology. It functions with an intention sensor on the gear lever, hydraulic actuator, and transmission control unit (TCU). The TCU receives a signal from the lever intention sensor, indicating the driver’s intention to change gears, which then sends a signal to engage the hydraulic actuator forming hydraulic pressure. The hydraulic pressure is then sent to the concentric slave cylinder (CSC) through the clutch tube. The CSC uses this pressure to control the clutch and pressure plate, thereby engaging and disengaging the clutch.

Facelift 
In 2022, Hyundai launched the refreshed version of Venue in India in June 2022. It received a redesigned front and rear fascia, digital instrument cluster, and added equipment list. The N Line variant was added in August 2022.

North America 
Both a 6-speed manual transmission (available only on base SE trim) and an Intelligent Variable Transmission (IVT) will be available (the latter is standard on the SEL and Denim, optional on the SE), and the Venue is available exclusively with front-wheel drive (FWD). Trim levels are base SE and up-level SEL. The manual transmission was discontinued for the 2021 model year due to low sales.

Standard features on all Venue trim levels include Forward Collision-Avoidance Assistance with Pedestrian Detection, Lane Keep Assist, Driver Attention Warning, and an 8-inch display infotainment system with Android Auto and Apple CarPlay smartphone integration. Available options include Blind-Spot Collision Warning, Rear Cross-Traffic Collision Warning, LED lamps, alloy wheels, sunroof, two-tone roof, navigation, Hyundai Blue Link technology, a 6-speaker audio system, and roof side rails. There is also a lifestyle version called the Venue Denim, only available in Denim Blue with a White roof combined with a Denim and light gray leatherette interior. The Denim was renamed to the Limited trim after 2021.

Australia 
Launched in September 2019, Australian-bound Venues come in three grades consisting of Go, Active & Elite, and sit below the dimensionally larger Hyundai Kona. A 'Launch Edition' grade based on the Elite was also initially available and limited to 100 units, featuring unique exterior colours and a power sunroof. All are powered by the 1.6-litre Gamma inline-four petrol engine available with a 6-speed manual transmission or 6-speed automatic transmission depending on the variant.

For the Australian market, the Venue acts as an indirect replacement for the fourth-generation Hyundai Accent, due to the lack of right-hand-drive fifth-generation Accent production from South Korea for the time being. The entry price for the Venue has been kept low in order to maintain future entry-level customers.

Safety 

In 2021, the IIHS awarded the Hyundai Venue a Top Safety Pick Key award, and NHTSA rated it at four out of five stars for safety, with one star deducted due to rollover and front risk ratings of four stars. Safety features include six airbags, an electronic stability control system, a vehicle stability management system, a forward collision warning alarm, a pedestrian detection warning alarm, blind-spot detection, and rear cross-traffic assistance. The active lane-keeping assistance, automatically adjustable high beams LED headlights, and blind-spot detection are given as standard in all SEL trims. The Hyundai Venue has had 1 recall for seat belt pre-tensioners, with 72,142 units at risk, due to risk of explosion.

Powertrain

QX models

QXi models

Sales

Global sales

Regional sales

References 

Cars introduced in 2019
Crossover sport utility vehicles
Front-wheel-drive vehicles
Venue
Mini sport utility vehicles
Venue
Cars of India
Vehicles with CVT transmission